Vertigo (French:Vertige) is a 1917 French silent film directed by André Hugon and starring Régine Marco, André Nox, Marie-Louise Derval.

Cast
 Régine Marco as La Princesse Vadioff  
 André Nox as Pierre Daler  
 Marie-Louise Derval as Suzanne  
 Léon Bernard as Le peintre Tissière 
 Maggy Delval 
 Ridd

References

Bibliography
 Rège, Philippe. Encyclopedia of French Film Directors, Volume 1. Scarecrow Press, 2009.

External links

1917 films
Films directed by André Hugon
French silent films
French black-and-white films
1910s French films